Markiyan Dimidov is a Ukrainian concentration camp survivor who was only eight in 1943 when Nazis set fire to his 3-year-old sister, Feofania, in a shed in a Belarus forest, along with his grandmother, great-grandmother and 2-year old cousin. Six decades later, Dimidov gained a small measure of compensation for that suffering, €7,670 (US$10,000), from the German Forced Labour Compensation Programme.

References

Jewish concentration camp survivors
Ukrainian Jews
Living people
Year of birth missing (living people)